The Larrousse LH93 was the car with which the Larrousse team competed in the 1993 Formula One season. The LH93 was Larrousse's first in-house chassis, following six seasons with Lola and Venturi chassis. Driven by Philippe Alliot, Érik Comas and Toshio Suzuki, the LH93 scored three points, giving the team tenth in the Constructors' Championship.

Development
Throughout the 1993 season, rumours spread of Peugeot's return to Formula One as an engine supplier. These rumours were later confirmed with Peugeot announcing their intention to build engines for the 1994 season. To get the attention of a lucrative factory engine, Larrousse had no choice but to build their own chassis. Larrousse's 1993 challenger borrowed heavily from the previous year's Venturi chassis. The wheelbase was shortened by 3.5 inches by moving the front wheels back, allowing for a larger front wing with midplates. The monocoque remained identical, while the sidepods were enlarged to aid in cooling the 3.5 litre Lamborghini V12. Brembo brakes were ditched in favour of French Carbone Industrie units. British Petroleum fuels were replaced by Elf fuels over the winter as well. Although the team was perpetually low on funds, Larrousse was able to complete a substantial amount of pre-season testing at Paul Ricard. Larrousse originally intended to have an active suspension pioneered by Williams, but rising costs and fears that it would be banned at the season's close meant the project was quickly abandoned.

Racing record
The opening races of 1993 seemed promising for the fledgling Larrousse squad, even after suffering the embarrassment of a double-retirement in the opening round. Alliot and Comas brought both cars to the finish in Brazil, with Alliot narrowly missing out on points in 7th. The team had a miserable race in Donington's downpour. Alliot crashed on his own while Comas finished 4 laps down, ahead of only Michele Alboreto's Lola. Larrousse's efforts would finally pay off at Imola, with Alliot outlasting a sea of retirements to score a fine fifth and two crucial points. In Spain, Alliot and Comas drove nose to tail from lap one until Alliot's gearbox let go 26 laps in. Comas finished 9th after a race long battle with Mark Blundell, Christian Fittipaldi, and Aguri Suzuki. It was the first of what would become an 8-race streak in which one Larrousse failed to finish due to a mechanical failure. By this point, money had run out and not a single part was updated after Hockenheim. The team's second double-finish came 7 months after their first, with the luckless Comas surviving a crash-strewn Italian Grand Prix to take a point for sixth. Things looked to be on the upswing for the team, with only one retirement in the final four races. Sadly Larrousse's points tally leaving Monza would remain unchanged. Penniless, Gérard Larrousse hired the well-funded Toshio Suzuki to replace Alliot for Japan and Australia.

Complete Formula One results
(key)

References

Larrousse Formula One cars